Claudia Schneider (born September 16, 1951) is an American former rower. She competed in the women's quadruple sculls event at the 1976 Summer Olympics.

References

External links
 

1951 births
Living people
American female rowers
Olympic rowers of the United States
Rowers at the 1976 Summer Olympics
Sportspeople from Giessen (region)
21st-century American women
World Rowing Championships medalists for the United States
People from Limburg-Weilburg